Tillim is a surname. Notable people with the surname include:

Guy Tillim (born 1962), South African photographer
Sidney Tillim (1925–2001), American artist and art critic